The Spy Killer is a 1969 American action thriller drama spy television film originally aired on ABC and directed by Roy Ward Baker. Its teleplay, written by Jimmy Sangster, was based on his own 1967 novel private i. The film starred Robert Horton, Sebastian Cabot, and Jill St. John. In the following year, a sequel titled Foreign Exchange was released with the same main cast and crew.

Both novels were reprinted by Brash Books in September 2019 in ebook, paperback and audio editions.

Plot
Former spy turned private eye John Smith (Robert Horton) is wrongly arrested for the murder of his ex-wife's new husband. Smith then finds himself acquitted for the crime by his former intelligence boss (Sebastian Cabot), but in return for a notebook from his time as a spy. This book lists the names of Western agents operating covertly in Red China, and as Smith discovers, others are also chasing the book.

Cast
 Robert Horton: John Smith 
 Jill St. John: Mary Harper 
 Sebastian Cabot: Max 
 Lee Montague: Igor 
 Eleanor Summerfield: Mrs. Roberts
 Barbara Shelley: Danielle 
 Kenneth J. Warren: Diaman

References

External links
 
 

1969 television films
1969 films
Action television films
American thriller television films
American drama television films
Spy television films
ABC Movie of the Week
Films directed by Roy Ward Baker
1960s spy films
Films with screenplays by Jimmy Sangster
Cold War spy films
Films produced by Jimmy Sangster
1960s English-language films
1960s American films